Leptopelis gramineus is a species of frog in the family Arthroleptidae. It is endemic to Ethiopia and occurs on the Ethiopian Highlands on both sides of the Great Rift Valley. Common names Badditu forest treefrog and Ethiopian burrowing tree frog have been coined for it.

Description
Adult males measure  and adult females  in snout–vent length; size varies considerably among populations. The dorsal colour is almost always green. Darker markings may be present but only very rarely form a triangle. There is a lateral series of large, dark brown blotches. Skin of the dorsum is rather coarsely granular, sometimes warty. Males have pectoral glands.

The male advertisement call is a single, deep "clack", sometimes preceded by a creaking sound.

Habitat and conservation
Leptopelis gramineus typically inhabits montane grasslands, sometimes Afro-alpine moorland or even forest margins and montane forests. It can also occur in rural gardens and human settlements. It is a fossorial species. Reproduction takes place in pools and small streams, both permanent and temporary.

This species is common to abundant at suitable sites. Because of its adaptability, it is not considered being significantly threatened by environmental degradation caused by human settlement and small to large-scale agriculture. Chytrid fungus is common in the area, but its impact on this species is unknown. It occurs in the Bale Mountains National Park (although the park offers limited protection only).

References

gramineus
Frogs of Africa
Amphibians of Ethiopia
Endemic fauna of Ethiopia
Amphibians described in 1898
Taxa named by George Albert Boulenger
Taxonomy articles created by Polbot